Chelamchi also Sailab-Chini is a kind of portable metal basin with flat surface. It is placed in front of a person after meals for washing hands. It is traditionally used with guests and dignified personalities. In India it is practiced in traditional families of Hyderabad, India and among the Dawoodi Bohra community.

References
Bohra Muslims, their distinctive cuisine and eating practices, The National (Abu Dhabi).
Maráthas and Dekhani Musalmáns, page-122, by R. M. Betham, Asian Educational Services 1996.

 
Bidar